Solomon's Lodge, located in Savannah, Georgia, is a Masonic lodge was founded in 1734 by the founder of the colonial Province of Georgia, General James Oglethorpe, and James Lacey and claims to be the oldest continually operating lodge in America, a title also claimed by St. John's Lodge, Portsmouth, New Hampshire, which was founded in 1734 or 1736. It is the mother lodge of the Grand Lodge of Georgia, and between 1734 and 1785 was the only lodge in Georgia. It was not called Solomon's Lodge until 1776, previously being known as "The Lodge at Savannah."  It occupied the former Savannah Cotton Exchange building. The first person to be initiated into the lodge was the settler and plantation founder Noble Jones.

It has often been confused with Solomon's Lodge in Charleston, South Carolina, also a founding lodge for that state that was founded in the same year.

Prominent members
Many members of Solomon's Lodge have held prestigious positions throughout history in the armed forces, government, and public service. Several prominent members of the Lodge are listed below.

References

Masonic Lodges
History of Savannah, Georgia
Organizations based in Georgia (U.S. state)